The European rhinoceros beetle (Oryctes nasicornis) is a large flying beetle belonging to the subfamily Dynastinae.

Subspecies
 Oryctes nasicornis afghanistanicus Endrödi, 1938
 Oryctes nasicornis chersonensis Minck, 1915
 Oryctes nasicornis corniculatus Villa & Villa, 1833
 Oryctes nasicornis edithae Endrödi, 1938
 Oryctes nasicornis grypus (Illiger, 1803)
 Oryctes nasicornis hindenburgi Minck, 1915
 Oryctes nasicornis holdhausi Minck, 1914
 Oryctes nasicornis illigeri Minck, 1915
 Oryctes nasicornis kuntzeni Minck, 1914
 Oryctes nasicornis latipennis Motschulsky, 1845
 Oryctes nasicornis mariei (Bourgin, 1949)
 Oryctes nasicornis nasicornis (Linnaeus, 1758)
 Oryctes nasicornis ondrejanus Minck, 1916
 Oryctes nasicornis polonicus Minck, 1916
 Oryctes nasicornis przevalskii Semenow & Medvedev, 1932
 Oryctes nasicornis punctipennis Motschulsky, 1860
 Oryctes nasicornis shiraticus Endrödi & Petrovitz, 1974
 Oryctes nasicornis transcaspicus Endrödi, 1938
 Oryctes nasicornis turkestanicus Minck, 1915

Description
It is one of the largest beetles  found in Europe. Elytra are reddish brown with a glazed appearance, while head and pronotum are slightly darker. The underside of the body and the legs are covered with long red hair. It is a sexually dimorphic species. The male's head is topped by a long curved horn (hence its common name), while the females have no horns.
 
Dim, from the 1998 Disney/Pixar animated film A Bug's Life, is a European rhinoceros beetle voiced by (Brad Garrett).

Distribution
Oryctes nasicornis inhabits the Palaearctic region, excluding the British Isles. It is the only representative of the Dynastinae family found in Northern Europe. It is widespread in the Mediterranean basin up to Pakistan, the Near East and North Africa.

Habitat
The rhinoceros beetle lives on wood, and the large larvae can be found in rotting wood stumps and around sawdust. At the margin of its distribution, the beetle is often found in connection with sawmills and horse racing tracks.

Life cycle
The larvae grow in decaying plants feeding on woody debris (xylophagy), generally non-resinous. The development period lasts 2 to 3 or 4 years. The adult size can be influenced by the quality and abundance of food.

The mammoth wasp (Megascolia maculata) is a parasite of European rhinoceros beetle larvae. A female wasp lays one egg inside the beetle larva; when the egg hatches, the wasp larva will feed on the beetle larva.

The adult beetle emerges at the end of March, April or May, and lives several months until autumn. It occurs mainly during the months of June and July and it is very active, flying at dusk and by night, attracted by the lights. These beetles do not feed, consuming during the few weeks of adult life reserves accumulated during the larval stages.

References

Notes

Dynastinae
Beetles of Europe
Beetles described in 1758
Taxa named by Carl Linnaeus